Xenochroa is a genus of moths of the family Nolidae. The genus was described by Felder in 1874.

Species
 Xenochroa adoxa (Prout, 1924)
 Xenochroa annae (C. Swinhoe, 1904)
 Xenochroa argentipuncta (Holloway, 1976)
 Xenochroa argentipurpurea (Holloway, 1976)
 Xenochroa argentiviridis (Holloway, 1976)
 Xenochroa balteata (Warren, 1912)
 Xenochroa biviata (Hampson, 1905)
 Xenochroa calva (Warren, 1916)
 Xenochroa careoides (Warren, 1912)
 Xenochroa chlorostigma (Hampson, 1893)
 Xenochroa costiplaga (C. Swinhoe, 1893)
 Xenochroa diagona (Hampson, 1912)
 Xenochroa diluta (Warren, 1912)
 Xenochroa dohora Kobes, 1997
 Xenochroa ferrinigra (Holloway, 1976)
 Xenochroa ferriviridis (Holloway, 1976)
 Xenochroa fulvescens (Warren, 1912)
 Xenochroa fuscomarginata (Hampson, 1894)
 Xenochroa fuscosa (A. E. Prout, 1928)
 Xenochroa leucocraspis (Hampson, 1905)
 Xenochroa mathilda (C. Swinhoe, 1904)
 Xenochroa mediogrisea (Warren, 1912)
 Xenochroa minima (Warren, 1916)
 Xenochroa moira (C. Swinhoe, 1893)
 Xenochroa notodontina Felder, 1874
 Xenochroa obvia (Hampson, 1912)
 Xenochroa perspicua (Prout, 1922)
 Xenochroa plesiogramma (A. E. Prout, 1926)
 Xenochroa pryeri (H. Druce, 1911)
 Xenochroa purpurea (Hampson, 1891)
 Xenochroa purpureolineata (Hampson, 1918)
 Xenochroa ronkayi Kobes
 Xenochroa rubrifusa (Hampson, 1905)
 Xenochroa sibolgae (Roepke, 1935)
 Xenochroa transpurpuralis (Holloway, 1976)
 Xenochroa triguttata (Warren, 1916)
 Xenochroa trilineata (Warren, 1912)
 Xenochroa verticata (Warren, 1916)
 Xenochroa xanthia (Hampson, 1902)

References

Chloephorinae